William Burton Jones (born April 25, 1979) is an American politician and businessman who is serving as the 13th lieutenant governor of Georgia, since 2023. A member of the Republican Party, he has been a member of the Georgia State Senate, elected from the 25th district, from January 2013 to January 2023.

Education
Jones is a 1998 graduate of Woodward Academy and a 2002 graduate of University of Georgia, where he played football and majored in history. He was co-captain of the 2002 Georgia Bulldogs football team, which won the SEC Championship.

Career as oil and insurance executive
A wealthy oil executive, he is heir to the Jones Petroleum Company. In 2004, Jones founded  JP Capital & Insurance, Inc., an insurance business in Jackson, Georgia. The insurance and lending company is a subsidiary of Jones Petroleum Co.

Political career

Georgia Senate 
Jones was elected a member of the state Senate in 2013.

Attempt to overturn 2020 presidential election results
While some Georgia Republicans acknowledged Joe Biden's victory in the 2020 presidential election, Jones denied the election results and promoted Trump's false claims of election irregularities. In December 2020, Jones was one of four state Senate Republicans who signed a petition calling on the Georgia General Assembly to overrule the outcome of democratic elections within the state and "take back the power to appoint electors." The petition called on Governor Brian Kemp to convene a special session of the legislature to award Georgia's 16 electors to Trump, who narrowly lost the state. Kemp denied the request.

On January 5, 2021, hours before the U.S. Senate certified the electoral votes from the 2020 election, Jones brought a letter signed by himself and 16 other State Legislators attempting to delay the certification. While Jones had a private audience with Vice President Mike Pence that evening he decided against delivering the letter instead leaving it with his Uber driver.

On January 19, 2021, Lieutenant Governor Geoff Duncan stripped Jones of his chairmanship and membership of the state Senate Insurance and Labor Committee. Over a series of months in 2021, Jones continued to question the results of the presidential election in Georgia. In July 2021, Jones was featured at a pro-Trump convention in Rome, Georgia, centering on Trump's false claims of election fraud.

In January 2022, the Justice Department began a criminal investigation into Jones' as one of the false electors who attempted to forge electoral certificates for the State of Georgia after the 2020 election. 
In July 2022, Fulton County, Georgia prosecutor Fani Willis announced that she had sent a target letter to Jones and two other Republican officials, warning them that they face indictment in connection with the fake electors scheme, which was part of the attempts to overturn the 2020 United States presidential election.

Butts County Water & Sewage Authority 
Jones has been a member of the board of directors of the Butts County Water and Sewage Authority since 2009. While a board member, he voted to raise water and sewer rates.

Campaign for lieutenant governor

Jones announced his candidacy for the Republican nomination for lieutenant governor in August 2021. During his campaign, Jones continued to cast doubt on the validity of the 2020 presidential election. Donald Trump endorsed Jones.

In 2022, the Georgia Government Transparency and Campaign Finance Commission fined Jones $1,000 for filming and tweeting a campaign video the previous year before filing the paperwork necessary to accept campaign contributions and make campaign consent orders. The Commission's consent order said that Jones' campaign had accepted responsibility for the error. Between February and May 2022, Jones used his family's private aircraft to travel to campaign events, without reporting the flights' costs as expenses and in-kind contributions on disclosure forms; Jones' campaign said that he intended to report the costs as a single line item after the primary election was over, although Georgia law requires expenses and contributions to be disclosed as they are made.

In the May 2022 Republican primary, Jones defeated Butch Miller, with Jones receiving 50.1% of the vote, Miller 31.1%, Mack McGregor 11.3%, and Jeanne Seaver 7.5%. Obtaining a majority, he narrowly avoided a runoff election. Of Georgia's 159 counties, Jones received the most votes in 153 counties, and Miller received the most votes in six counties. He went on to defeat Democratic nominee Charlie Bailey in the November 8th general election, by 5%.

Electoral history

References 

|-

|-

 

1979 births
21st-century American businesspeople
21st-century American politicians
American energy industry executives
Lieutenant Governors of Georgia (U.S. state)
Living people
People from Jackson, Georgia
Place of birth missing (living people)
Republican Party Georgia (U.S. state) state senators
Woodward Academy alumni